Gunungia is a genus of snout moths. It was described by Rolf-Ulrich Roesler and Peter Victor Küppers in 1979.

Species
 Gunungia capitirecava Ren & Li, 2007
 Gunungia rimba Roesler & Küppers, 1979

References

Phycitinae
Pyralidae genera